R521 road may refer to:
 R521 road (Ireland)
 R521 road (South Africa)